Kevin Beardsley is a former New Zealand sprinter.

At the 1950 British Empire Games he won the bronze medal as part of the men's 4 x 110 yard relay alongside Arthur Eustace, Peter Henderson and Clem Parker. He also competed in the 100 yards where he placed 6th in his semi-final.

References

New Zealand male sprinters
Commonwealth Games bronze medallists for New Zealand
Athletes (track and field) at the 1950 British Empire Games
Commonwealth Games medallists in athletics
Living people
Year of birth missing (living people)
20th-century New Zealand people
Medallists at the 1950 British Empire Games